Jackie Thompson (born July 20, 1954) is an American sprinter. She competed in the women's 200 metres at the 1972 Summer Olympics.

References

External links
 

1954 births
Living people
Athletes (track and field) at the 1972 Summer Olympics
American female sprinters
Olympic track and field athletes of the United States
Track and field athletes from San Diego
Olympic female sprinters
21st-century American women